Philiris oreas is a species of butterfly of the family Lycaenidae. It is found in Western New Guinea (Snow Mountains, Mount Goliath) and possibly on Biak.

References

Butterflies described in 1963
Luciini